Lambaréné Airport  is an airport serving the city of Lambaréné in the Moyen-Ogooué Province of Gabon. The runway has and additional  of unpaved overrun on the northeastern end.

The Lambarene non-directional beacon (Ident: LB) is located southwest of the field.

See also
 List of airports in Gabon
 Transport in Gabon

References

External links
Google Maps - Lambaréné
Lambaréné Airport
OpenStreetMap - Lambaréné
OurAirports - Lambaréné

Airports in Gabon